Liz Carey is an American actress, comedian, personality, podcaster and writer.

Career
After moving to California from Ohio at age 17, Carey pursued a career in modelling and was signed to Wilhelmina Models. In December 1995, while on the set of the music video for the British band Oasis' "Don't Look Back in Anger" single, she met her the Oasis drummer, Alan White. They married in 1997 and divorced in 2004.

In 2006, Carey designed a range of handbags for her clothing line Bird. The name of the company later had to be changed to Liz Carey handbags after a legal dispute with Juicy Couture, after it launched its own line with the same name in 2009.

After she launched her career covering the red carpet for E! News, Carey broke into comedy through her role as Craig Ferguson's sidekick on The Late Late Show. Shortly after, she was on Comedy Central's The Showbiz Show with David Spade and has since written and performed many sketches for Funny or Die. From 2011 to 2014, she was a series regular on Chelsea Lately, and is a contributing writer to various publications, including The Hive and New York magazine.

As an actress, Carey has appeared on CBS' Elementary and CBS All Access' Strange Angel. She has recurred on Netflix's Love and ABC's Super Fun Night with Rebel Wilson, and has had guest spots on series including CBS' 2 Broke Girls. She has appeared in films including The 40-Year-Old Virgin, Spanglish, Walk of Shame and Alexander and the Terrible, Horrible, No Good, Very Bad Day. She performed with Miles Teller in Bleed for This and with Mark Wahlberg in Peter Berg's Deepwater Horizon.

Carey was a writer and actor for Fameless with David Spade and the co-host of the podcast Girlboss Radio with the Nasty Gal founder, Sophia Amoruso.

Filmography

Film

Television

References

External links

YouTube podcast

21st-century American women writers
American film actresses
American television actresses
American women podcasters
American podcasters
Living people
1978 births